Raja Jani is a 1972 Bollywood film, produced by Madan Mohla, directed by Mohan Segal, and written by S. Ali Raza. The film stars Dharmendra, Hema Malini, Premnath, Prem Chopra, Johnny Walker, Durga Khote, Sajjan, Helen and Bindu. The music is by Laxmikant–Pyarelal. It was the fourth highest-grossing film of the year. It was loosely based on the 1956 American movie Anastasia. It was remade in Tamil in 1983 as Adutha Varisu.

Plot

Raj Kumar Singh "Raja"(Dharmendra) who tries to find a girl who would be a perfect impostor to take the place of the missing princess Ratna. During an assassination of her parents she disappeared, and during the last ten years her grandmother, queen Rajmata(Durga Khote) has been looking for her. Raja finds a street dancer named Shanno(Hema Malini), and finally, after extensive training of teaching the etiquettes so they can disguise and present her as the long lost princess so they can get the reward money from finding her, she enters the house as the long-awaited princess. What he does not know is something that may spoil his intentions to get the money through her, and it is that Shanno turns out to be the real princess her grandmother was searching for.

Cast
Dharmendra as Raj Kumar Singh "Raja"
Hema Malini as Ratna / Shanno
Premnath as Diwan Gajendra Singh
Prem Chopra as Pratap Bahadur Singh
Johnny Walker as Imartilal
Durga Khote as Rajmata
Sajjan as Khairati
Nadira as Shanno's foster mother
Jankidas as Dr. Nigam
C. S. Dubey as Bagla Seth's Servant
Helen as Item Dancer (Guest Appearance)
Suresh
Manmohan as Latpat Seth (Guest Appearance)
Bindu as Raja's Ex-Girlfriend (Guest Appearance)
Rajan Haskar

Soundtrack
The music composed by Laxmikant–Pyarelal.

References

External links 
 

1972 films
1970s Hindi-language films
Films scored by Laxmikant–Pyarelal
Hindi films remade in other languages
1970s Urdu-language films
Urdu films remade in other languages
Indian drama films
1972 drama films
Urdu-language Indian films